The Anchorage is a historical home in the Harmar neighborhood of Marietta, Ohio, United States.  Also known as the Putnam Villa, it was built in 1859 by Douglas Putnam for his wife Eliza.  Douglas was the great grandson of General Israel Putnam.  Douglas' brother, David Putnam, Jr. was the leading abolitionist in Marietta.  David was said to frequent the home, leading to the belief the home was used as part of the Underground Railroad although no evidence has been uncovered.

In 1894, the Knox family bought the house from the Putnams.  The Knox family was involved in boat building and gave the home the name of The Anchorage.  From 1960 to 1986 the house was a nursing home.  Since 1996, the home has been owned by the Washington County Historical Society.

References

External links 
 WCHS The Anchorage

Houses on the Underground Railroad
Buildings and structures in Marietta, Ohio
Houses in Washington County, Ohio
National Register of Historic Places in Washington County, Ohio
Historic district contributing properties in Ohio
Houses on the National Register of Historic Places in Ohio
Houses completed in 1859
1859 establishments in Ohio